Michigan v. Environmental Protection Agency, 576 U.S. 743 (2015), is a landmark United States Supreme Court case in which the Court analyzed whether the Environmental Protection Agency must consider costs when deciding to regulate, rather than later in the process of issuing the regulation. 

Writing for a 5–4 majority, Justice Antonin Scalia held that the EPA must consider costs and that it interpreted the Clean Air Act unreasonably when it determined that it did not need to consider costs when it issued a "finding" that it was "necessary and appropriate" to regulate.

Critics of the Environmental Protection Agency praised the Court's decision, while other commentators criticized Justice Scalia's decision to ignore health impacts in his opinion. Some commentators like Andrew M. Grossmann from the Cato Institute suggested that the decision may derail President Barack Obama's climate change agenda entirely.

Background

National Emissions Standards for Hazardous Air Pollutants Program
In 1990, Congress amended the Clean Air Act to create new regulations for over 180 different kinds of "hazardous air pollutants" emitted from stationary sources. 

One of the programs created by the 1990 amendments was the National Emissions Standards for Hazardous Air Pollutants Program, which regulated pollution from "major sources" of air pollution. At the same time, Congress developed a procedure to determine the applicability of the Hazardous Air Pollutants Program to power plants that generated electricity from fossil fuels. 

These procedures directed the Environmental Protection Agency ("EPA") to study the effects of emissions of hazardous pollutants from these power plants on public health, and to regulate power plants if "regulation is appropriate and necessary after considering the results of the study." 

When regulating sources, the Clean Air Act states that the EPA must enforce minimum emissions regulations (known as "floor standards") and to consider costs, among other factors, when implementing more stringent emissions standards (known as "beyond-the-floor standards"). The EPA later interpreted the Clean Air Act to mean that "power plants become subject to regulation on the same terms as ordinary major and area sources"

EPA action and subsequent suit
The EPA completed the required study in 1998 and concluded that regulation of coal and oil-fired power plants was "appropriate and necessary." 

In 2012, the Agency reaffirmed the "appropriate and necessary" finding and promulgated floor standards, finding that "mercury and other hazardous air pollutants posed risks to human health and the environment." Although the EPA estimated that regulations would cost power plants $9.6 billion per year, the EPA concluded that "“costs should not be considered” when determining whether power plants should be regulated. 

A group of non-profit organizations, corporations, and 23 states filed suit to challenge the EPA's refusal to consider costs when regulating power plants, but the United States Circuit Court for District of Columbia upheld the Agency's decision to not consider costs. In 2014, the Supreme Court of the United States granted certiorari to resolve the question of whether the EPA must consider costs when regulating power plants under the Clean Air Act.

Opinion of the Court

Writing for a 5–4 majority, Justice Antonin Scalia held that the EPA interpreted the Clean Air Act unreasonably when it decided that it should not consider costs when regulating power plants. Justice Scalia analyzed the EPA's interpretation of the Clean Air Act under Chevron Deference, and concluded that the Agency "strayed far beyond [the] bounds" of "reasonable interpretation" when it determined that it could ignore costs. Looking at the language of the Clean Air Act, Justice Scalia concluded that when "[r]ead naturally in the present context, the phrase 'appropriate and necessary' requires at least some attention to cost." Additionally, Justice Scalia wrote that it is irrational and inappropriate "to impose billions of dollars in economic costs in return for a few dollars in health or environmental benefits." Consequently, Justice Scalia ruled that the EPA "must consider cost — including, most importantly, cost of compliance — before deciding whether regulation is appropriate and necessary."

Concurring and dissenting opinions
Justice Clarence Thomas wrote a separate concurring opinion urging the Court to re-evaluate the extent to which it defers to agency interpretations of statutes. He also wrote, "we should be alarmed that [the EPA] felt sufficiently emboldened by those precedents to make the bid for deference that it did here."

Justice Elena Kagan wrote a dissenting opinion in which she argued that the EPA did, in fact, consider costs and benefits when implementing regulations, which include "$80 billion" in quantifiable benefits and "as many as 11,000 fewer premature deaths annually, along with a far greater number of avoided illnesses." Additionally, Justice Kagan concluded that the EPA acted "well within its delegated authority" when it implemented regulations for power plants.

Commentary and analysis
Commentators have observed that critics of the EPA "heralded" the Court's decision. However, some commentators have criticized Justice Scalia's decision to not consider health benefits in his opinion; one analyst wrote, "hundreds of thousands of people might have lived longer if regulations on mercury and other coal pollutants had not been tied up in court battles." Some commentators also suggested the Court's ruling may ultimately force other agencies to consider costs when promulgating and  implementing regulations. Analysts also noted that the Courts decision "may well leave the Obama climate agenda in tatters."

Responses to the ruling
An EPA spokesperson said "the agency intended to move forward with the rule." 

Patrick Parenteau, a specialist of environmental law at Vermont Law School, said that the Agency "has already done a detailed cost benefit analysis justifying the rule", and other scholars expressed doubt that the program would come to an end. However, other scholars suggested the EPA will likely revise their regulations in response to the Court's decision. Republican House Majority Leader Kevin McCarthy praised the Court's decision for "vindicat[ing] the House’s legislative actions to rein in bureaucratic overreach and institute some common sense in rule making."

Power plants have largely complied with the regulation while the United States Circuit Court for the District of Columbia considered the case on remand.

Implications for the future of Chevron Deference

Some commentators have suggested that Michigan v. EPA may foreshadow a retreat from the Court's prior administrative law jurisprudence, which generally gave deference to an agency's reasonable interpretation of an ambiguous statute. Additionally, one analyst identified Justice Clarence Thomas' concurring opinion as one of six opinions from the term in which he called for the Court to "systematically rethink administrative law on originalist grounds." Justice Thomas' doctrinal shift was described as the "beginning of Justice Thomas's originalist turn in administrative law", where he questions whether the Court's "delegation jurisprudence has strayed too far from our Founders' understanding of separation of powers."

See also 

 List of United States Supreme Court cases, volume 576
List of United States Supreme Court cases

Notes

References

External links
 
 

2015 in the environment
2015 in United States case law
United States environmental case law
United States Supreme Court cases
United States Supreme Court cases of the Roberts Court